Dorian Brew (born July 19, 1974) is a former professional American football player who played from 1996 to 2002.

Originally drafted by the Miami Dolphins in the third round of the 1996 NFL Draft, Brew signed with the Baltimore Ravens . After playing in eight games with the Ravens during his rookie year, Brew served as the team's kick returner for three game in 1997, returning five kicks for 88 yards. Brew signed with the Chargers for the remainder of the 1997 season playing in 8 games. After sitting out the 1998 season due to injuries, Brew made a comeback in 1999 playing for the NFL Europe team Frankfurt Galaxy. After finishing that season as one of the top defensive backs in the league, Brew signed a contract with the Chicago Bears in 1999 and spent the season on IR after injuring a knee. Brew played for the XFL's Chicago Enforces 2000-2001 finishing the season as a top DB ranking second in the league in interceptions. After a brief stint in the CFL with the Montreal Alouettes in 2002, he retired from football soon after.

1974 births
Living people
Players of American football from St. Louis
American football defensive backs
Kansas Jayhawks football players
Baltimore Ravens players
San Diego Chargers players
Chicago Bears players
Frankfurt Galaxy players